Zoltan Okalyi (born 31 January 1938) is an Australian fencer. He competed in the team foil event at the 1960 Summer Olympics. He was a longstanding member of the Melbourne-based VRI Fencing Club.

References

1938 births
Living people
Australian male fencers
Olympic fencers of Australia
Fencers at the 1960 Summer Olympics
People from Tolna County